Xihua Avenue is a metro station at Chengdu, Sichuan, China. It is opened on December 18, 2020 with the opening of Chengdu Metro Line 6. It is located near Happy Valley Chengdu.

References

Chengdu Metro stations
Railway stations in China opened in 2020